Loch Lomond is a rural locality in the Southern Downs Region, Queensland, Australia.

History 
The locality takes its name from Loch Lomond in Scotland.

Loch Lomond Provisional School opened on 23 November 1903. On 1 January 1909 it became Loch Lomond State School. It closed on 13 February 1976. It was on the southern corner of Warwick Killarney Road and Mckee Road.

The Presbyterian Church was officially opened on Sunday 20 August 1905, having been relocated from Tanneymorel. It was damaged in a cyclone in December 1915. It was on the south-eastern corner of Warwick Killarney Road and Middle Road.

Education 
There are no schools in Loch Lomond. The nearest government primary schools are Murray's Bridge State School in neighbouring Murrays Bridge to the west and Killarney State School in neighbouring Killarney to the south-east. The nearest government secondary schools are Killarney State School (to Year 10 only) and Warwick State High School (to Year 12) in Warwick to the north-west

References

Further reading 

 

Southern Downs Region
Localities in Queensland